Molly Peacock (born Buffalo, New York 1947) is an American-Canadian poet, essayist, biographer and speaker, whose multi-genre literary life also includes memoir, short fiction, and a one-woman show.

Career
Peacock's latest book is Flower Diary: Mary Hiester Reid Paints, Travels, Marries & Opens a Door , a layered memoir and biography that examines the balancing act of female creativity and domesticity in the life of Mary Hiester Reid, a painter who produced over three hundred stunning, emotive floral still lifes and landscapes. Critics noted that the biography is written with the "lingering observations and lyrical touch of an established poet, yet with an easygoing, conversational tone often lacking in didactic art biographies." As with The Paper Garden, this "lush and beautifully produced"  treatise also tracks Peacock's own marriage with the late Joyce scholar Michael Groden.

Peacock's works include The Paper Garden, a biography of Mary Delany, an 18th-century gentlewoman and a meditation on late-life creativity. The Paper Garden was selected as a book of the year by The Economist, which said of the work, "Like flowers built of a millefeuille of paper, Ms Peacock builds a life out of layers of metaphor." Her latest book of poems is The Analyst, a collection exploring her evolving relationship with her psychoanalyst who, after a stroke, reclaimed her life through painting. She was a Faculty Mentor at the Spalding University Brief Residency MFA Program, 2001-13. Molly Peacock is also the author/performer of a one-woman show in poems, "The Shimmering Verge" produced by Louise Fagan Productions, reviewed by Laura Weinert in the New York Times. "She can inhabit a moment with quiet intensity: in a haunting poem about an alcoholic father hovering over her, she fully enters her scene, gripping the folds of fabric around her as if they might swallow her alive."

She has published seven collections of poetry, including The Second Blush, love poems from a midlife marriage and Cornucopia: New & Selected Poems. Widely anthologized, her work is included in The Best of the Best American Poetry 1988–1997 and The Oxford Book of American Poetry, as well as in leading literary journals such as the Times Literary Supplement, The New Yorker, and The Paris Review.

Peacock is the author of a memoir, Paradise, Piece By Piece. Her essay on Mrs. Delany, "Passion Flowers in Winter", appeared in The Best American Essays. Other pieces appear in O: The Oprah Magazine, Elle, House & Garden, and New York Magazine. She is also the editor of a collection of creative non-fiction, Private I: Privacy in a Public World.

As President of the Poetry Society of America, Molly Peacock was one of the creators of the Poetry in Motion program; coediting Poetry In Motion: One Hundred Poems From the Subways and Buses. She was also the Series Editor of The Best Canadian Poetry in English (Tightrope Books)from 2008–2017, as well as a Contributing Editor of the Literary Review of Canada.

Peacock keeps in touch with New York City, her former home, by teaching at the 92nd Street Y every February and March as she has since 1985.

Personal life 
Peacock was born in Buffalo, New York. Currently, she lives in downtown Toronto and holds dual Canadian-American citizenship. She was married to scholar Michael Groden, who died in March 2021.

Writings

Poetry
 And Live Apart, University of Missouri Press, 1980, 
 Raw Heaven, Random House, 1984, 
 Take Heart, Random House, 1989, 
 Original Love, Lightning Source Inc, 1996, 
 Cornucopia: New & Selected Poems,	W.W. Norton, 2002, 
 
 The Analyst, W.W. Norton. 2017. Fiction
 Alphabetique, 26 Characteristic Fictions, McClelland & Stewart, 2014, 

Non-fiction

; Bloomsbury Publishing USA, 2011, How To Read A Poem and Start A Poetry Circle, Riverhead Books, 1999, Paradise, Piece By Piece, Riverhead Books, 1998, 

Edited anthologies
 Poetry in Motion: 100 Poems from the Buses and Subways (co-edited with Elise Paschen and Neil Neches). New York: Norton, 1996. 
 The Private I: Privacy in a Public World. Saint Paul: Graywolf P, 2001. 
 The Best Canadian Poetry in English (each annual volume co-edited with a different Guest Editor). Toronto: Tightrope Books, 2008— .

Selected essays
 "What the Mockingbird Said." Conversant Essays: Contemporary Poets on Poetry. Ed. James McCorkle. Detroit: Wayne State UP, 1990. 343–347.
 "One Green, One Blue: One Point about Formal Verse Writing and Another About Women Writing Formal Verse." A Formal Feeling Comes: Poems in Form by Contemporary Women. Ed. Annie Finch. Ashland, OR: Story Line P, 1994.
  "The Poet As Hybrid Memoirist." The Writer 112.2 (February 1999): 20–22.
 "From Gilded Cage to Rib Cage." After New Formalism: Poets on Form, Narrative, and Tradition. Ed. Annie Finch. Ashland, OR: Story Line P, 1999. 70–78.
 "Introduction." The Private I: Privacy in a Public World. vii-ix.
 "Sweet Uses of Adversity." The Private I: Privacy in a Public World. 80–94.
  "Rhyme and the Line." A Broken Thing: Poets on the Line. Eds. Emily Rosko and Anton Vander Zee. Iowa City: U of Iowa P, 2011. 176–177.
 "A Calendar of Affections." Arc Poetry Magazine 65 (2011): 166–171.
 "New Formalism at the Millenium." Green Mountains Review'' 25.1 (2012): 268–272.

Honours
Peacock has received recognition from the Leon Levy Center for Biography (CUNY), Danforth Foundation, Ingram Merrill Foundation, Woodrow Wilson Foundation, National Endowment for the Arts, and New York State Council on the Arts. She was President of the Poetry Society of America from 1989 to 1995, and again from 1999 to 2001. She served as Poet in Residence at the American Poets' Corner, Cathedral Church of St. John the Divine from 2000 to 2005.  Peacock was also Regents' Fellow at University of California, Riverside and Poet in Residence at Bucknell University and the University of Western Ontario.

Residencies 
 The Poetry Center, 92nd Street YM/YWHA, New York. 1985–present.
 Poet-in-Residence, Poets' Corner, Cathedral of St. John the Divine, New York. 2000–2004.
 Visiting Writer, Bennington College 2002
 Woodrow Wilson Fellow 1994–2001
 Regents Lecturer, University of California, Riverside. 1998.
 Writer-in-Residence, University of Western Ontario. 1995–1996.
 Poet-in-Residence, Bucknell University. 1993.
 Visiting Poet, Columbia University, 1986, 1992.
 Poet-in-Residence, Barnard. 1989–1992.
 Visiting Poet, Sarah Lawrence College 1990.
 Visiting Poet, Hofstra University, 1986.

References

External links
 Molly Peacock's Personal webpage
 Interview with Laura Leichum 
 Brooklyn Rail interview
 Pif Magazine interview
  Molly Peacock papers, Binghamton University Libraries

1947 births
Living people
20th-century Canadian poets
21st-century Canadian poets
Writers from Buffalo, New York
Formalist poets
Canadian women poets
American women poets
Spalding University faculty
20th-century Canadian women writers
21st-century Canadian women writers
20th-century American poets
Kentucky women writers
20th-century American women writers
American women academics
21st-century American women